¡Megaton Shotblast! is the debut album by American dub reggae band De Facto. Largely instrumental, the album pulls influence from various genres, including electronica, dub, reggae, and jazz.

Track listing
"Manual Dexterity" – 2:21
"Cordova" (Live) – 10:17
"El Professor Contra De Facto" – 4:59
"Fingertrap" – 3:13
"Descarga De Facto" (Live) – 8:18
"Mitchel Edward Klik Enters A Dreamlike State... And It's Fucking Scandalous" – 4:27
"Thick Vinyl Plate" (Live) – 6:49
"Coaxial" – 7:15
"Simian Cobblestone" – 4:23
"Rodche Defects" – 3:57

Personnel
Omar Rodríguez-López - bass
Cedric Bixler-Zavala - drums
Isaiah Ikey Owens - keyboards
Jeremy Ward - melodica, sound manipulation
Alberto "El Professor" Aragonez - percussion (3, 10)
Ralph Dominique Jasso - keys (3)
Eric Salas - percussion (3)
David Lopez - trumpet (4, 10)
Gabe Gonzalez - piano (9)
Ángel Marcelo Rodríguez-Cheverez - vocals (10)

References 
 https://web.archive.org/web/20120227034127/http://defacto.bandcamp.com/album/megaton-shotblast

De Facto (band) albums
2001 albums
Gold Standard Laboratories albums